Britannia was launched in 1794 at Northfleet. She made two voyages as an "extra ship" for the British East India Company (EIC). On her second voyage a French privateer captured her, but the British Royal Navy recaptured her shortly thereafter. She then became a West Indiaman and was lost c.1801.

Career

1st EIC voyage
Captain Thomas Nixon jnr. received a letter of marque for Britannia on 22 August 1795. He left Yarmouth on 20 September 1795, bound for Bengal. She arrived at Calcutta on 22 February 1796. 

There she loaded rice on behalf of the British government which was importing grain to address high prices for wheat in Britain following a poor harvest.

Homeward bound, Britannia was at Culpee on 31 March, and at Saugor on 19 April. She reached St Helena on 22 July, and arrived at The Downs on 15 September.

2nd EIC voyage
Captain James Stewart received a letter of marque on 17 December 1796. He left Britain on 3 January 1797. They took her into Cork. She reached home on 8 October.

Subsequent career
In 1799 Timperon purchased Britannia. Captain J. Mann replaced Stewart and her trade became London-Grenada. She was last listed in Lloyd's Register in 1804, but the Register of Shipping for 1801 has the notation "LOST". Lloyd's List for 25 September 1801 reported that Britannia, from Jamaica to London, was lost at Old Harbour, Jamaica.

Notes, citations, and references
Notes

Citations

References
 
 

1794 ships
Ships built in England
Ships of the British East India Company
Captured ships
Age of Sail merchant ships
Merchant ships of the United Kingdom
Shipwrecks in the Caribbean Sea